Ivanka may refer to:


People
 Ivanka (given name), including a list of people with the name

Places
 8573 Ivanka (1996 VQ), a Main-belt Asteroid discovered in 1996
 Ivanka pri Dunaji (Hungarian: Pozsonyivánka), a village and municipality in western Slovakia
 Ivanka pri Nitre, a village and municipality in the Nitra District in western central Slovakia

Other uses
 Ivanka (horse) (born 1990), Thoroughbred racehorse
 "Ivanka", a song by Imperial Teen on the album On

See also
 Ivanković, surname
 Jovanka (disambiguation)